Cecilia Raquel Costa Melgar (born 26 December 1992) is a Chilean former tennis player.

Costa Melgar won four singles and seven doubles titles on the ITF Women's Circuit. On 20 May 2013, she reached her best singles ranking of world No. 367. On 8 September 2014, she peaked at No. 216 in the doubles rankings.

Since her debut for Chile in 2010, Costa Melgar has realized a 15–6 record for her country in Fed Cup competition.

After retiring from professional tennis, Costa Melgar became a beach tennis player.

ITF finals

Singles: 10 (4–6)

Doubles: 17 (7–10)

References

External links
 
 
 

1992 births
Living people
Sportspeople from Viña del Mar
Chilean female tennis players
Female tennis players playing beach tennis
South American Games gold medalists for Chile
South American Games medalists in tennis
Competitors at the 2010 South American Games
21st-century Chilean women